Isaiah Meïr Kahana Shapira (28 July 1828 – 9 January 1887) was a Polish-German rabbi and author.

Biography
Shapira was born in Memel, Prussia, in 1828. He is said to have been familiar at the age of thirteen with all the sedarim of both Talmudim and with a part of the poskim. About 1845 he studied philosophy, mathematics, and astronomy, and as early as 1848 he wrote on ethics for different journals. 

Shapira engaged in business as a merchant; but a fire destroyed all his belongings, and he was compelled to accept the rabbinate of Czortkow. Before assuming office, however, he went to Lemberg to train himself in the necessary secular studies. He studied philosophy, ethics, and theology in the academy there for nine months.

He was installed as rabbi in 1860. After two years a quarrel broke out between the two Ḥasidic sects in the town. Shapira interposing to make peace, the brunt of the dissension was turned against him and his inclination to secular education; and he was for a time even deprived of his livelihood. Peace was, however, soon restored. The last ten years of his life Shapira spent in retirement.

Publications

References
 

1828 births
1887 deaths
19th-century German rabbis
People from East Prussia
People from Klaipėda